Brian Frisselle (born 28 December 1983) is an American former racing driver.

Career

Frisselle competed full-time for eight years in the Rolex Sports Car Series, alongside a part-time season in 2012. In 2008, Frisselle's third year in the series, he won his first race, at the Circuit Gilles Villeneuve. At the time, Frisselle's victory was the closest in series history at 0.064 seconds, as the leading car ran out of fuel on the way to the finish. He followed that up with a second victory the following week at Watkins Glen, leading 79 of 82 laps. Prior to the 2009 Rolex Sports Car Series season, Frisselle joined SunTrust Racing in the Daytona Prototype class. For the 2013 Rolex Sports Car Series season, Frisselle joined Action Express Racing in the Daytona Prototype class. In 2014, Frisselle won the 25 Hours of Thunderhill alongside co-drivers Randy Pobst, Alex Lloyd, and Kyle Marcelli.

Brian's brother Burt Frisselle also raced in the Rolex Sports Car Series. The two were co-drivers for much of their careers, and together they placed third overall at the 2014 24 Hours of Daytona.

Racing record

Career summary

Complete Grand-Am Rolex Sports Car Series results
(key) (Races in bold indicate pole position)

Complete WeatherTech SportsCar Championship results
(key) (Races in bold indicate pole position)

References

External links
Brian Frisselle at Motorsport.com

1983 births
Living people
American racing drivers
24 Hours of Daytona drivers
Rolex Sports Car Series drivers
WeatherTech SportsCar Championship drivers
Formula BMW USA drivers
Morand Racing drivers
Meyer Shank Racing drivers
Action Express Racing drivers
Wayne Taylor Racing drivers
Racing drivers from California
Racing drivers from Los Angeles
Sportspeople from Los Angeles